The Saint Paul Trail is a long-distance footpath in Turkey, approximately 500 km long. The trail begins in Perge, about 10 km east of Antalya, and it ends in Yalvaç, Isparta, northeast of Lake Eğirdir. A second branch starts at the Oluk Köprüsü (Roman Bridge over the Köprülü River), 100 km north-east of Antalya, and joins the main route at the ancient Roman site of Adada.

The name of the trail is derived from the fact that a part of it follows the route Saint Paul the Apostle took on his first missionary journey to Anatolia. It starts at sea level and climbs to 2200 m in elevation. It is marked along the way with red and white stripes to Grande Randonnée standards.

The trail is one of a group of trails associated with the Culture Routes Society of Turkey. The organization publishes a guidebook for the Saint Paul Trail, and in September 2011 released a digital guidebook iPhone application that provides users with GPS navigation and localized information about trail attractions and amenities.

See also
List of long-distance footpaths
Lycian Way
Evliya Çelebi Way

References

Other sources
Kate Clow (with Terry Richardson). St Paul Trail: Turkey's Second Long Distance Walking Route. Upcountry, 2004, .
Stephen Goodwin. "Return of the Saint: On the road from Perge to Antioch". The Independent on Sunday, 25 July 2004.
"St. Paul was here: Antioch in 'Pisida'". Today's Zaman, 9 January 2008.

External links
Cultureroutesturkey.com
Turkey's St. Paul Trail Trip report of a 2011 walk on the St. Paul Trail
Wegbeschreibung und viele Informationen rund um dem St Paul Trail von Peter Lill
Downloadable gps file of the whole St Paul Trail (In Turkish)

Tourism in Turkey
Hiking trails in Turkey
Paul the Apostle